Mount Read is the name of several places:
Australia:
Mount Read (Tasmania), a mountain on the West-Coast of Tasmania
Mount Read (Northern Territory), a hill in the Northern Territory
Canada:
Mount Read (British Columbia), a mountain on Gilford Island